Gino Soldà (8 March 1907 – 8 November 1989) was an Italian cross-country skier. He competed in the men's 18 kilometre event at the 1932 Winter Olympics.

References

External links
 

1907 births
1989 deaths
Italian male cross-country skiers
Olympic cross-country skiers of Italy
Cross-country skiers at the 1932 Winter Olympics
Sportspeople from the Province of Vicenza